Cumbia & Jazz Fusion is an album by Charles Mingus, recorded for the Atlantic label in 1977. It features two extended compositions written for the film Todo Modo by Mingus and performed by large ensembles featuring Jack Walrath, Jimmy Knepper, Paul Jeffrey, Ricky Ford, Dannie Richmond, Candido, Ray Mantilla, George Adams and Danny Mixon. The CD reissue added two solo performances by Mingus on piano.

Critical reception 
Village Voice critic Robert Christgau felt Cumbia & Jazz Fusions loftier compositions suggested Mingus was more of an "important jazz eccentric" rather than a "great": "The 27-minute title fantasia is rich, lively, irreverent, and enjoyable, but it's marred by overly atmospheric Hollywood-at-the-carnival moments, while the kitschy assumed seriousness of 'Music for Todo Modo' almost ruins its fresh big-band colors." AllMusic critic Scott Yanow later wrote: "The music is episodic but generally holds its own away from the film".

Track listing 
All compositions by Charles Mingus

Tracks 3 & 4 are bonus tracks on CD.

Personnel 
 Charles Mingus: bass, vocals, percussion, arranger
 Jack Walrath: trumpet, percussion (tracks 1 & 2)
 Jimmy Knepper: trombone, bass trombone (track 1)
 Mauricio Smith: flute, piccolo, soprano saxophone, alto saxophone (track 1)
 Paul Jeffrey: oboe, tenor saxophone (track 1)
 Gene Scholtens: bassoon (track 1)
 Gary Anderson: contrabass clarinet, bass clarinet (track 1)
 Ricky Ford: tenor saxophone, percussion (track 1)
 Bob Neloms: piano (track 1)
 Dannie Richmond: drums (tracks 1 & 2)
 Candido: congas (track 1)
 Daniel Gonzales: congas (track 1)
 Ray Mantilla: congas (track 1)
 Alfredo Ramirez: congas (track 1)
 Bradley Cunningham: percussion (track 1)
 Dino Piana: trombone (track 2)
 Anastasio Del Bono: oboe, english horn (track 2)
 Pasquale Sabatelli: bassoon (track 2)
 Roberto Laneri: bass clarinet (track 2)
 Giancarlo Maurino: alto saxophone (uncredited) (track 2)
 Quarto Maltoni: alto saxophone (track 2)
 George Adams: tenor saxophone, alto flute (track 2)
 Danny Mixon: piano, organ (track 2)

References

Further reading
 
 

1978 albums
Atlantic Records albums
Charles Mingus albums
Albums arranged by Charles Mingus